Phạm Duy Tốn (1881 – 25 February 1924) was a Vietnamese writer. He was father of the songwriter Phạm Duy and French language writer and ambassador Phạm Duy Khiêm.

Tốn graduated from the French School of Interpreters, and became part of the modernist movement of writers including also Confucian trained scholars. He published alongside Confucian writers like Nguyen Ba Hoc in Nam Phong magazine, showing more ability to give straightforward prose unconstrained by classical structures. In 1907 he was appointed one of three teachers at the Association for Mutual Education (Hội Trí Tri,  Société d’Enseignement Mutuel du Tonkin) in Hanoi. 

His writing touched on social themes, as in the story Sống chết mặc bay (Who Cares if you Survive or Die, 1918) but open criticism of the French had to be veiled in social narrative.

Works
 Phạm Duy Tốn, Tác phẩm chọn lọc (complete works) ed. Cừ Nguyẽ̂n - 2002

References

1881 births
1924 deaths